Stinchcomb is a surname. Notable people with the surname include:

Jon Stinchcomb (born 1979), American football offensive tackle
Gaylord Stinchcomb (1895–1973), American football player
Matt Stinchcomb (born 1977), former football offensive tackle

English toponymic surnames